The 9th Legislative Assembly of British Columbia sat from 1900 to 1903. The members were elected in the British Columbia general election held in June 1900. James Dunsmuir served as Premier until he resigned in November 21, 1902. Dunsmuir was succeeded by Edward Gawler Prior, who was dismissed by the lieutenant governor for conflict of interest. Richard McBride became Premier in June 1902.

John Paton Booth served as speaker until his death in February 1902. Charles Edward Pooley succeeded Booth as speaker.

Members of the 9th General Assembly 
The following members were elected to the assembly in 1900. This was the last election where political parties were not part of the official process, although a number of candidates declared party affiliations:

Notes:

By-elections 
By-elections were held for the following members appointed to the provincial cabinet, as was required at the time:
David McEwen Eberts, Attorney General, acclaimed July 4, 1900
John Herbert Turner, Minister of Finance and Agriculture, acclaimed July 4, 1900
Wilmer Cleveland Wells, Chief Commissioner of Lands and Mines, acclaimed July 17, 1900
James Douglas Prentice, Provincial Secretary and Minister of Education, acclaimed July 17, 1900
James Dunsmuir, Premier, acclaimed July 17, 1900
Richard McBride, Minister of Mines, acclaimed July 17, 1900
John Cunningham Brown, Provincial Secretary, defeated by Thomas Gifford on September 25, 1901
William Wallace Burns McInnes, Provincial Secretary and Minister of Education, elected January 30, 1903

By-elections were held to replace members for various other reasons:

Notes:

Other changes 
Westminster-Dewdney (res. Richard McBride, appointed premier June 1, 1903) 
Vancouver City (res. Robert Garnett Tatlow, appointed Minister of Finance and Agriculture June 4, 1903)
Victoria City (res. Albert Edward McPhillips, appointed Attorney General June 4, 1903)
West Kootenay-Slocan (res. Robert Francis Green, appointed Minister of Mines June 4, 1903)

References 

Political history of British Columbia
Terms of British Columbia Parliaments
1900 establishments in British Columbia
1903 disestablishments in British Columbia
20th century in British Columbia